Leoš Škoda (born 1 May 1953) is a Czech ski jumper. He competed at the 1972 Winter Olympics and the 1980 Winter Olympics.

References

1953 births
Living people
Czech male ski jumpers
Olympic ski jumpers of Czechoslovakia
Ski jumpers at the 1972 Winter Olympics
Ski jumpers at the 1980 Winter Olympics
Sportspeople from Liberec